Ramón Paz Ipuana (December 17, 1937 in Yosuitpa – October 27, 1992 in Paraguaipoa) was a Venezuelan writer, researcher, linguist and poet of Wayuu origin.  He is considered one of the most important writers in the Wayuu language.

Biography
Paz Ipuana worked in the Normal School of Maracaibo forming intercultural bilingual Wayuunaiki-Spanish teachers. After his death in 1992, his daughters Neima, Neida, Mayui, and Esmeralda continued publishing his works based on the manuscripts of traditional Wayuu stories he left.

Works 
 Mitos, leyendas y cuentos guajiros (1973). Instituto Agrario Nacional – Programa de Desarrollo Indígena.
 El Conejo y el Mapurite (1979).  Ediciones Ekaré, .
 El Burrito y la Tuna (1979). Ediciones Ekaré. .
 La Capa del Morrocoy (1982). Ediciones Ekaré. 
 La leyenda de Waleker (2007). Ministerio del Poder Popular para la Educación. 
 Ale'eya. Cosmovisión wayuu: Relatos sagrados, conceptos y descripciones de la cultura wayuu (2016). Fondo Editorial Wayuu Alaülayu.

References

1937 births
1992 deaths
Venezuelan people of Wayuu descent
Wayuu people
Venezuelan writers
Wayuu-language writers
People from Zulia